The Tagus International Natural Park is a protected area in Portugal and Spain. It is an important area for the conservation of several species of birds that nest on the rugged banks of rivers and surrounding areas. It is also one of the lowest human density areas in the Iberian Peninsula.

For part of its course, the River Tagus forms the boundary between Spain and Portugal. Areas on both sides of the river are designated as natural parks by the respective nations. However, while the Portuguese side of the park is a IUCN category V (protected landscape), the Spanish side is categorized as a wilderness area, thus being much more restricted.

See also
Douro International Natural Park & Arribes del Duero Natural Park

References

Nature parks in Portugal
Natural parks of Spain
Tagus basin
Transboundary protected areas
Biosphere reserves of Portugal
Biosphere reserves of Spain
Portugal–Spain border